Dasht, Dasht-e, Dashhti, or Dasht-i, are Persian words for "plain" or "plain of", and may refer to:

Places

Afghanistan
 Dasht-e Borsoneh, a village in the Bamyan Province
 Dasht-e Leili desert, site of the alleged Dasht-e-Leili massacre
 Dasht-e Margo, a desert in Afghanistan

Armenia
 Dasht, Armenia, a town in the Armavir Province of Armenia

Iran

Geographic features
Dasht-e Kavir, a desert in north-central and northeastern Iran
 Dasht-e Lut, desert in southeastern Iran

Localities
Dasht Rural District (Meshgin Shahr County), a subdivision of Ardabil province
Dashti, Chaharmahal and Bakhtiari, a village in Chaharmahal and Bakhtiari province
Dashti County, a subdivision of Bushehr province
Dashti-ye Esmail Khani, a village in Bushehr province
Dashti-ye Esmail Khani Rural District, in Bushehr province
Dasht, Fars, a village in Fars province
Dashti, Fars, a village in Fars province
Dashti, Golestan, a village in Golestan province
Dashti, Hormozgan, a village in Hormozgan province
Dashti, Ilam, a village in Ilam province
Dashti, Isfahan, a village in Isfahan province
Dasht Rural District (Isfahan Province), a subdivision of Isfahan province
Dasht-e Bozorg, a village in Khuzestan province
Dashti-ye Hoseyn Aqa, a village in Khuzestan province
Dasht, North Khorasan, a village in North Khorasan province
Dasht, Khvaf, a village in Khvaf County of Razavi Khorasan province
Dasht, Nishapur, a village in Nishapur County of Razavi Khorasan province
Dasht, South Khorasan, a village in South Khorasan province
Dashti, West Azerbaijan, a village in West Azerbaijan province
Dasht Rural District (Urmia County), a subdivision of West Azerbaijan province

Pakistan
 Dasht (Kharan), a town and tehsil of the Kharan District in the Balochistan province of Pakistan
 Dasht-e-Goran, Pakistan, a town of the Kalat District in the Balochistan province of Pakistan
Dasht, Kech District, a tehsil of Kech District, Balochistan
 Dera Ghazi Khan District
 Muzaffargarh District
 Dera Ismail Khan District

Tajikistan
 Dasht, Tajikistan, a site of the University of Central Asia campus

People
Lara Dashti (born 2004), Kuwaiti Olympic swimmer
 Dashti or Dasti is another name for the Rind (tribe), a Baloch tribe of Baluchistan

Music, film and television
 Dashti is one of the twelve Dastgahs in Persian Music
Dasht (television series), a 1993 Pakistani drama series

See also
 Dashtestan, a township in the northern part of the Bushehr Province of Iran